{{infobox person
| name         = Richie Jen
| image        = 任贤齐 Richie Jen 2022 1.jpg
| alt          = 
| caption      = Jen in 2022
| birth_date   = 
| birth_place  = Tianzhong, Changhua, Taiwan
| occupation   = Actor, singer, songwriter
| years_active = 1990–present
| children     = 2
| alma_mater   = Chinese Culture University
| awards       = {{ubl|{{awards|award=Hong Kong Film Awards|title=Best Original Film Song|year=1999|role=Fly Me to Polaris}}|Golden Melody Awards Best Video (12th)}}
| website      = 
| module       = 
| module2      = 
}}

Richie Jen Hsien-chi (born 23 June 1966) is a Taiwanese singer and actor. He graduated from the Chinese Culture University's physical education department. 

 Early life 
Jen was born and grew up in Tianzhong Township, Changhua County, Taiwan. He attended Changhua County Tianzhong Senior High School and at the age of 21 he entered the physical education department of Chinese Culture University. He also started to work at a musical instrument store while learning how to play guitar.

 Career 
In December of that year, he released his first solo album Ask Again (再問一次). He released two more albums in 1991, Cold & Tender (冷漠與温柔), and Fly to My Own Sky (飛向自己的天空), before enlisting in the military.

In 1996, he joined Rock Records, and released the album I Feel Good!, which sold 160,000 copies. His breakthrough came when the album Too Softhearted (心太軟) was released, which sold millions of copies and the title track became popular in China and Taiwan.

In 1998, Jen's album Love Like Pacific Ocean (愛像太平洋) was released. The tracks "Unknown Pleasures" (任逍遥) "The Sad Pacific" (傷心太平洋) from the album were the opening and closing theme songs of the 1998 series The Return of the Condor Heroes, respectively. Jen also starred in the Condor Heroes, playing Yang Guo.

In 2005, Jen joined EMI, and his first album from EMI Old Place (老地方) was released a year later.

In 2008, Jen signed a contract with East Asia Records (東亞唱片).

 Personal life 
In 2002, Richie Jen married former fashion designer Tina Chen (陳則妤). They have two children together, a daughter and a son. They live in Hong Kong.

Filmography

Film
 Rob N Roll (TBD)
 Kowloon Walled City (TBD)
 Where All Roads End (2019) 
 Fagara (2019)
 Bodies at Rest (2019) 11th Day and One Night 星语心愿2 (2015)Trivisa 树大招风 (2015)All You Need Is Love (2015)
 The Wonderful Wedding (2015) – Cameo First of May 五月一号 (2015)Will You Still Love Me Tomorrow? 明天記得愛上我 (2013)Scheme With Me 雙城計中計 (2012)The Allure Of Tears 傾城之淚 (2011)Legendary Amazons 楊門女將之軍令如山 (2011)Life Without Principle 奪命金 (2011)Mayday 3DNA 五月天追夢3DNA (2011)Punished 報應 (2011)Adventure of the King 龍鳳店 (2010)Flirting Scholar 2 唐伯虎點秋香2 (2010)Fire of Conscience 火龍對決 (2010)Accident 意外 (2009)The Sniper 神槍手 (2009)Lady Cop & Papa Crook 大搜查 (2008)Contract Lover 合約情人 (2007)Happy Birthday 生日快樂 (2007)Exiled 放-逐 (2006)2 Become 1 天生一對 (2006)Seoul Raiders 韓城攻略 (2005)Breaking News 大事件 (2004)20 30 40 20 30 40 (2004)Elixir of Love 花好月圓 (2004)Silver Hawk 飛鷹 (2004)6th Floor Rear Flat 六樓後座 (2003)Honesty 絕種好男人 (2003)Summer I Love You 好心相愛 (2002)Marry a Rich Man 嫁個有錢人 (2002)Life Express 生死速遞 (2001)Summer Holiday 夏日的麽麽茶 (2000)Fly Me to Polaris 星願 (1999)A Beautiful New World 美麗新世界 (1999)Gorgeous 玻璃樽 (1999)No Sir 3 報告班長3 (1994)Top Cool 傲空神鷹-想飛 (1993)Cops & Robbers 官兵捉強盜 (1991)

Television seriesMidnight Diner 深夜食堂(2017)Infernal Affairs 无间道 (2016)Top Gear China 巅峰拍档 (2014–2015)Chinese Idol 中国梦之声 (2013–2014)Supreme Fate 富豪海灣至尊家緣 (2004)The New Adventures of Chor Lau Heung 新楚留香 (2001)State of Divinity 笑傲江湖 (2000)The Return of the Condor Heroes 神雕俠侶 (1998)Taipei Love Story 台北愛情故事 (1996)Master Huang 黃飛鴻與十三姨 (1994)Dreams Awakening 夢醒時分 (1994)Hard To Forget 意難忘 (1992)The Orphans 人海孤鴻 (1989)

Variety and reality showCall Me by Fire (season 2) 披荊斬棘 (2022)

Discography
Album + EP, single

1990-06-01 Ask Again (再問一次)
1991-03-01 Cold & Tender (冷漠與温柔)
1991-06-01 Fly to My Own Sky (飛向自己的天空)
1996-06-01 I Feel Good! (依靠)
1996-12-01 Heart Too Soft (心太軟)
1997-12-01 Hurt Badly (很受傷)
1998-08-01 Love Like Pacific Ocean (愛像太平洋)
1998-09-01 Hey Girl Look This Way (對面的女孩看過來)
1999-06-01 Series Compilation & New Songs (認真精選輯)
1999-08-01 Care (著緊)
2000-01-27 Desperate With Love (為愛走天涯)
2000-08-01 Wanderer (流浪漢)
2000-12-05 Angel Brother and Hunk (天使兄弟小白臉)
2001-09-14 A Flying Bird (飛鳥)
2002-02-06 I'm A Rich Man (我是有錢人)
2002-09-01 One Richie (一個任賢齊)
2003-04-15 A Wonderful Man (男人真幸福)
2004-03-25 The Years Of Richie (情義)
2005-01-01 So Far So Close (兩極)
2006-02-27 Old Place (老地方)
2007-04-26 If Life's Goin' Without You (如果沒有你)
2009-04-27 Qi Dai R.S.V.P (齊待)
2010-05-28 Music Traveller (音樂旅行者)
2011-12-02 Daredevil Spirit'' (不信邪v)
Richie Ren also appeared in the MV of Beijing welcomes you.

References

External links

Richie Ren at LoveHKFilm.com
 Richie Jen official website
Richie Ren's Lyrics

1966 births
Living people
20th-century Taiwanese male singers
20th-century Taiwanese male actors
21st-century Taiwanese male singers
21st-century Taiwanese male actors
Taiwanese Mandopop singer-songwriters
Taiwanese male film actors
Taiwanese male television actors
People from Changhua County
Taiwanese expatriates in Hong Kong
People with acquired permanent residency of Hong Kong
Chinese Culture University alumni